Festuca molokaiensis is a species of grass in the family Poaceae native to Hawaii. This species typically blooms throughout the year and appears in a green or brown colour when blooming. The U.S. Fish & Wildlife Service has classified the species as Endangered.

Characteristics 
Festuca molokaiensis grows up to 28 inches tall and fruits caryopsis. This species is a short-lived perennial, is cespitose with culms, scabrous below branched panicles, has inflorescence with spikelets and develops on secondary branches.

Habitat 
Festuca molokaiensis typically is found on steep slopes in a mesic forest biome.

References  

molokaiensis